Anita Kažemāka (born 30 May 1990) is a Latvian long-distance runner. She competed in the marathon event at the 2015 World Championships in Athletics in Beijing, China.

References

External links

1990 births
Living people
Latvian female long-distance runners
Latvian female marathon runners
World Athletics Championships athletes for Latvia
Place of birth missing (living people)